Panampilly Memorial Government College is a Government run college situated in Chalakudy in Thrissur District of Kerala. The college is affiliated to the University of Calicut.

Academic Programmes offered

Undergraduate Programmes
BCom co-operation
BA Economics
BA Political Science
BSc Mathematics
BSc Physics

Postgraduate Programmes
MCom Finance
MA Economics
MA Political Science
MSc Mathematics
MA Malayalam

Research Programmes
PhD Economics

Accreditation
The college is recognized by the University Grants Commission, and included in 2(f) and 12(B). It is accredited (cycle 2) by NAAC, Bangalore at ‘B’ Grade on four point scale. The college is named after Panampilly Govinda Menon, the erstwhile minister of Cochin.

References

Colleges affiliated with the University of Calicut
Universities and colleges in Thrissur district
Educational institutions established in 1975
1975 establishments in Kerala
Education in Chalakudy
Buildings and structures in Chalakudy